6ix Commandments is the debut mixtape by American rap group Da Mafia 6ix and hosted by Trap-A-Holics. The mixtape was released on November 12, 2013 as well as a no DJ version with Two bonus tracks on iTunes and later on a physical copy on January 7, 2014. A Chopped and Screwed version was released on December 17, 2013.

6ix Commandments features guest appearances from Yelawolf, Lil Wyte, The Outlawz, Space Ghost Purrp, Krayzie Bone, Bizzy Bone, 8Ball & MJG, Kokoe, Point Blank, J-Grxxn, Locodunit, Kingpin Skinny Pimp, La Chat and surprise guest appearances from Juicy J & Project Pat who were noted as "& More" on the tracklist.

Background
DJ Paul and Lord Infamous were in the process of rebirthing the Come With Me 2 Hell series when Lord Infamous decided that it would be better to try and reunite the old Three 6 Mafia instead. Gangsta Boo, Koopsta Knicca & Crunchy Black joined Paul and Infamous and reformed the old group under the new name Da Mafia 6ix. DJ Paul stated that he felt like it was a reunion, despite the absence of Juicy J. He thought of it rather as a whole new project, separate from Three 6 Mafia and decided to give the group a new name out of respect for Juicy J and to avoid potential complications involving the use of the Three 6 Mafia name without the approval of Juicy J and Columbia Records.

The mixtape was originally going to be called "Ressurlation", which was a meshing of the words Resurrection and Revelation, but was changed to "6ix Commandments" instead. The mixtape was deemed by DJ Paul a "sampler" for the upcoming album Watch What U Wish... by Da Mafia 6ix, which was scheduled to be released in 2014.

Track listing

Sample credits
 "Go Hard" contains a sample of "We Do What We're Told (Milgram's 37)" by Peter Gabriel.
 "Beacon N Blender" contains a sample of  "Long Red" by Mountain.
 "Betta Pray" contains a sample of "God is Dead?" by Black Sabbath, and dialogue from The Iceman.
 "Remember" contains a sample of "Fame" by Irene Cara. 
 "Yean High" contains a sample of "Pimps N The House" by 8Ball & MJG.

NO DJ version (album) track listing

Chopped Up, Tripped Out, Skrewed version track listing

Videos
Two introduction videos, three music videos and five vlogs have been released to promote the project as well as an additional video for promotion of the group that's of a classic song from the collective that's not a part of the project. The videos released are as follows;

Introduction videos
 "Introducing: Da Mafia 6ix" - July 9, 2013
 "Da Mafia 6ix TBAWW Trailer 2013" - September 25, 2013

Official music videos
 "Go Hard" (featuring Yelawolf) - October 8, 2013
 "Remember" (featuring Lil Wyte) - November 29, 2013
 "Where Is Da Bud" (Promotional Video) - December 6, 2013
 "Break Da Law" - January 31, 2014
 "Beacon N Blender" - April 7, 2014
 "Been Had Hard" - May 28, 2014

In response to fans on Twitter, DJ Paul has stated that there will be music videos to "Betta Pray" as well as "Body Parts".

*Been Had Hard cuts Gangsta Boo's verse off due to her departure.

Vlogs
 "Da Mafia 6ix Vlo6 #1: Yelawolf Talks Three 6 Mafia Influence, Go Hard and More! Exclusive!" - October 15, 2013
 "Da Mafia 6ix Vlo6 #2: DJ Paul x Gangsta Boo NYC Takeover!" - November 4, 2013
 "Da Mafia 6ix Vlo6 #3: The Bee Gees and Random Strangers?! NYC Pt 2" - November 12, 2013
 "Da Mafia 6ix Vlo6 #4: Lil Wyte Joins Da Mafia 6ix for "Remember"" - November 19, 2013
 "Da Mafia 6ix Vlo6 #5: Crunchy Black & Koopsta Knicca Turn Up in Knoxville!" - January 5, 2014

Tour
In 2014, the group announced that they would be going on "Da Triple Six Sinners" Tour in promotion of the mixtape and upcoming album. Twisted Insane was announced as a guest on the tour with the collective on all of the dates with the exception of two. The following dates have been confirmed on DJ Paul's website:

Charts

References

DJ Paul albums
Three 6 Mafia albums
Horrorcore albums
2014 albums